was a Japanese pathologist known for the discovery of the atrioventricular node.

Tawara was born in Ōita Prefecture and studied at the Medical School, Imperial University of Tokyo in Tokyo, graduating in 1901 and receiving his Doctorate of Medical Science in 1908. Between 1903 and 1906 he spent in Philipps University of Marburg in Marburg, studying pathology and pathological anatomy with Ludwig Aschoff. It was here he undertook his important works on pathology and anatomy of heart. Upon returning to Japan he was appointed assistant professor of pathology at Kyushu Imperial University in Fukuoka, obtaining full professorship in 1908.

Node of Tawara: a remnant of primitive fibers found in all mammalian hearts at the base of the interauricular septum, and forming the beginning of the auriculoventricular bundle or bundle of His, which is a muscular band, containing nerve fibers, connecting the auricles with the ventricles of the heart.  The Node of Tawara is also called the atrioventricular node, the auriculoventricular node, Aschoff's node, and the node of Aschoff and Tawara.

Tawara's monograph, "Das Reizleitungssystem des Säugetierherzens" (English: "The Conduction System of the Mammalian Heart") was published in 1906.

Works 
Die Topographie und Histologie der Brückenfasern. Ein Beitrag zur Lehre von der Bedeutung der Purkinjeschen Fäden. (Vorläufige Mitteilung). Zentralblatt für Physiologie, Band 19, Nr. 3, 6. Mai 1905, S. 70-77
Anatomisch-histologische Nachprüfung der Schnittführung an den von Prof. H. E. Hering übersandten Hundeherzen.. Archiv für die gesamte Physiologie des Menschen und der Tiere, Band 111, No 7-8, 20 February 1906, S. 300-302.
Über die sogenannten abnormen Sehnenfäden des Herzens. Ziegler’s Beiträge zur Pathologischen Anatomie und zur allgemeinen Pathologie, Band 39, 1906, S. 563-584
Das Reizleitungssystem des Säugetierherzens. Eine anatomisch-histologische Studie über das Atrioventrikularbündel und die Purkinjeschen Fäden. Jena:Gustav Fischer, 1906
Die heutige Lehre von den pathologisch-anatomischen Grundlagen der Herzschwäche: kritische Bemerkungen auf Grund eigener Untersuchungen.  (mit L. Aschoff). Jena: Fischer, 1906

Recognition
To honor his achievements, Kyushu University named a road Tawara Street. Also, Cambridge IGCSE honours him by using his name in their ICT practical exams.

Gallery

References 

L. Aschoff - Marburg: Bericht über die Untersuchungen des Herrn Dr. Tawara, die "Brückenfasern" betreffend, und Demonstration der zugehörigenmikroskopischen Präparate. Zentralblatt für Physiologie, Vol 19, No. 10, 12. August 1905, p. 298-301.
K. Suma: Sunao Tawara - a father of modern cardiology. Pacing Clin. Electrophysiol. No. 24 (2001), p. 88-96.
Kodansha Encyclopedia of Japan, Vol. 7 (1983), p. 351
E. J. Wormer: Syndrome der Kardiologie und ihre Schöpfer. München 1989, p. 9–16.
W. Michel: On the German Manuscript of S. Tawara's The Conduction System of the Mammalian Heart Proceedings of the 5th Tawara-Aschoff Symposium on Cardiac Conduction System, p. 45-49, Oita, Dec 2007. (written in Japanese) (pdf-file: Kyushu University Institutional Repository)

External links

M.E. Silverman / D. Grove, Ch. B. Upshaw, Jr, Why Does the Heart Beat? The Discovery of the Electricals System of the Heart. Circulation 2006, 113, 2775-2781
田原淳（たはらすなお）－心臓の電気的刺激伝導系の発見者 (Written in Japanese)

1873 births
1953 deaths
Japanese pathologists
University of Tokyo alumni
Laureates of the Imperial Prize
Academic staff of Kyushu University
19th-century Japanese physicians
20th-century Japanese physicians